Rory Joseph MacDonald (born July 22, 1989) is a Canadian former mixed martial artist who most recently competed in the Welterweight division of the Professional Fighters League (PFL). Prior to signing with the PFL, MacDonald competed for Bellator MMA, where he is a former Bellator Welterweight World Champion. Having been a  professional competitor since 2005, he is a former UFC top contender as well, and there he obtained an overall UFC record of 9–4, and challenged for the UFC Welterweight Championship at UFC 189 in a bout against then-champion Robbie Lawler. He is also a former King of the Cage Lightweight Champion.

Mixed martial arts career
MacDonald started his training with David Lea at the age of 14 and his fight team Toshido Fighting Arts Academy out of Kelowna, British Columbia. He made his professional debut at the age of sixteen, winning in the 1st round by submission against Terry Thiara at an Extreme Fighting Challenge event via rear naked choke.

King of the Cage
He then moved to 2–0, by beating Ken Tran in his King of the Cage (KOTC) debut. He won a fight in Rumble in the Cage and then signed exclusively with King of the Cage. He won two fights after signing and was then rewarded with a shot at the KOTC Canadian Lightweight title, against Kajan Johnson, which MacDonald won. MacDonald then was awarded a shot at the King of the Cage Lightweight Championship, against Clay French, MacDonald knocked him out in the second round. After the fight MacDonald moved up to welterweight and defeated Elmer Waterhen by first round armbar.

Ultimate Fighting Championship
MacDonald was signed to the UFC after compiling a 9–0 professional record.

He debuted for the promotion at UFC Fight Night 20 against Mike Guymon. Guymon dropped MacDonald with a right cross, before MacDonald quickly recovered, took Guymon down and won the fight with an armbar submission in the first round. MacDonald lost to Carlos Condit via third-round TKO at UFC 115 in a bout that earned the Fight of the Night award. MacDonald was competitive in the first two rounds using effective striking and taking Condit down three times. Condit came back with a more aggressive attitude in the final round and finished MacDonald with a combination of elbows and punches. After the fight, the judges' scorecards were revealed and showed that had MacDonald not been finished in the last seven seconds, he would have picked up a split decision victory. After this loss, Macdonald moved to Montreal and joined Tristar Gym, home of elite fighters such as former UFC Welterweight Champion Georges St-Pierre.

MacDonald was expected to face Matt Brown on November 20, 2010 at UFC 123, but was forced from the card with an injury and replaced by Brian Foster.

MacDonald was expected to face James Wilks on April 30, 2011 at UFC 129. However, Wilks was replaced on the card by Nate Diaz. MacDonald dominated Diaz during all three rounds (throwing Diaz via German Suplex three times in the third round) and earning a unanimous decision victory. MacDonald next faced and defeated Mike Pyle by TKO in the first round on August 6, 2011 at UFC 133.

MacDonald was expected to face Brian Ebersole on December 10, 2011 at UFC 140. However, MacDonald pulled out of the bout with an injury and was replaced by Claude Patrick. MacDonald beat Che Mills via second-round TKO on April 21, 2012 at UFC 145. After getting hit with hard shots in the first round, MacDonald took the fight to the ground, where he controlled the fight with his superior wrestling and ground and pound.

MacDonald was expected to face BJ Penn on September 22, 2012 at UFC 152.  However, MacDonald pulled out of the bout after sustaining a cut to the forehead while training.  The fight eventually took place on December 8, 2012 at UFC on Fox 5.  MacDonald dominated Penn for three rounds and won by unanimous decision.

MacDonald was expected to face Carlos Condit in a rematch on March 16, 2013 at UFC 158. However, MacDonald pulled out of the bout citing another injury, and was replaced by Johny Hendricks.

MacDonald defeated Jake Ellenberger by unanimous decision on July 27, 2013, at UFC on Fox 8. He used his size and reach advantage to repeatedly land his jab, neutralizing the shorter Ellenberger. UFC president Dana White criticized the performance as "lackluster".

MacDonald next lost a split decision to Robbie Lawler at UFC 167.

MacDonald beat Demian Maia by unanimous decision on February 22, 2014 at UFC 170, earning his second Fight of the Night bonus award. MacDonald almost had to pull out of this fight after stabbing himself in the hand while cutting an avocado.

MacDonald defeated Tyron Woodley by unanimous decision in the co-main event of UFC 174 on June 14, 2014.

MacDonald scored a third-round TKO on Tarec Saffiedine on October 4, 2014 at UFC Fight Night 54. This earned his first Performance of the Night bonus award.

MacDonald was expected to face Hector Lombard on April 25, 2015 at UFC 186.  However, on February 10, the UFC indicated that both participants had been removed from the card and that the pairing had been scrapped as both fighters are expected to be rebooked against a new opponent.

A rematch with then champion Robbie Lawler took place on July 11, 2015 at UFC 189. MacDonald lost the fight via TKO in the fifth round. The back and forth action earned both participants Fight of the Night honors. The fight was considered an instant classic by fans and media alike with UFC President Dana White hailing it as one of the best welterweight fights in the promotion's history.

MacDonald next faced Stephen Thompson on June 18, 2016 at UFC Fight Night 89. He lost the fight via unanimous decision.

Bellator MMA 
On August 26, 2016, MacDonald signed a contract with Bellator MMA. He subsequently appeared at Bellator 160 and announced his intentions to win both the welterweight and middleweight championships. In his Bellator debut, MacDonald fought Paul Daley in the main event at Bellator 179 on May 19, 2017. He won the one-sided fight via rear-naked choke in the second round.

MacDonald faced Bellator MMA welterweight champion Douglas Lima at Bellator 192 on January 20, 2018. He won the back-and-forth fight by unanimous decision. He sustained an injury with a big swelling on the shin of his left leg, midway through the fight.

MacDonald moved up and challenged Gegard Mousasi for the Bellator Middleweight Championship on September 29, 2018 at Bellator 206. He lost the fight via technical knockout in round two.

MacDonald next defended his Welterweight title against Jon Fitch in a fight that is simultaneously the first round of Bellator Welterweight World Grand Prix at Bellator 220 on April 27, 2019. The back-and-forth bout ended in a majority draw. Due to the fight ending in a draw, Macdonald retained the title and advanced to the semifinals against Neiman Gracie. MacDonald faced Gracie in the main event at Bellator 222 on June 14, 2019. He won the fight by unanimous decision.

In the Bellator Welterweight World Grand Prix final, MacDonald faced Douglas Lima in a rematch at Bellator 232 on October 26, 2019. He lost the fight and title via unanimous decision.

Professional Fighters League

PFL season 2021 
On December 18, 2019, it was announced that MacDonald had signed with the Professional Fighters League. After a year-long layoff, mainly due to PFL not running events in 2020 due to the COVID-19 pandemic, MacDonald was set to make his promotional debut on April 29, 2021, against David Michaud as the start of the 2021 PFL Welterweight tournament. On April 8, David announced he pulled out of the PFL season due to a heart condition. He was replaced by Bellator and UFC vet Curtis Millender. MacDonald won the bout in the first round via rear-naked choke.

MacDonald faced Gleison Tibau at PFL 5 on June 17, 2021. He lost the bout by a controversial split decision, with the vast majority of media scores and other professional MMA fighters scoring the bout as a win for MacDonald.

MacDonald faced Ray Cooper III in the semifinals of the Welterweight tournament on August 13, 2021 at PFL 7. He lost the bout via unanimous decision.

PFL season 2022 
MacDonald faced Brett Cooper on May 6, 2022 at PFL 3. MacDonald won the bout in the first round via rear-naked choke.

MacDonald faced Sadibou Sy on July 1, 2022 at PFL 6. In an upset, MacDonald lost the bout via unanimous decision.

MacDonald was scheduled to face Magomed Umalatov in the Semifinals of the Welterweight tournament on August 13, 2022 at PFL 8. However, after Umalatov was forced to pull out due to visa issues, he was replaced by Dilano Taylor. MacDonald lost the bout via TKO stoppage in the first round.

Retirement
On August 14, 2022, MacDonald announced his retirement from MMA competition.

Metamoris grappling

On November 22, 2014, MacDonald fought to a draw against Jonathan Torres in a grappling match in Metamoris V.

Personal life
MacDonald is of Scottish, Irish and Norwegian descent. He was raised Catholic, but has said he left the faith early in his life. In 2019, he became a Born Again Christian after an encounter with God.

MacDonald and his wife Olivia have a daughter Maia (born 2016) and a son Rocky (born 2019).

Championships and accomplishments

Mixed martial arts
Bellator MMA
Bellator Welterweight World Championship (One time)
Two successful title defenses 
Bellator Welterweight World Grand Prix Runner Up
Ultimate Fighting Championship
Fight of the Night (Three times)
Performance of the Night (One time)
King of the Cage
KOTC Lightweight Championship (One time)
KOTC Canadian Lightweight Championship (One time)
Bleacher Report
2015 Fight of the Year vs. Robbie Lawler at UFC 189
MMAJunkie.com
2014 February Fight of the Month vs. Demian Maia
2015 July Fight of the Month vs. Robbie Lawler
Top MMA News
Canadian Fighter of the Year (2012)
Wrestling Observer Newsletter
MMA Match of the Year (2015) vs. Robbie Lawler at UFC 189
World MMA Awards
2015 Fight of the Year vs. Robbie Lawler at UFC 189

Mixed martial arts record

 
|-
|Loss
|align=center|
|Dilano Taylor
|TKO (punches)
|PFL 8
|
|align=center|1
|align=center|3:59
|Cardiff, Wales
|
|-
|Loss
|align=center|23–9–1
|Sadibou Sy
|Decision (unanimous)
|PFL 6
|
|align=center|3
|align=center|5:00
|Atlanta, Georgia, United States
|
|-
|Win
|align=center|23–8–1
|Brett Cooper
|Submission (rear-naked choke)
|PFL 3
|
|align=center|1
|align=center|2:23
|Arlington, Texas, United States
|
|-
|Loss
|align=center|22–8–1
|Ray Cooper III
|Decision (unanimous)
|PFL 7 
|
|align=center|3
|align=center|5:00
|Hollywood, Florida, United States
|
|-
|Loss
|align=center|22–7–1
|Gleison Tibau
|Decision (split)
|PFL 5 
|
|align=center|3
|align=center|5:00
|Atlantic City, New Jersey, United States
|
|-
|Win
|align=center|22–6–1
|Curtis Millender
|Submission (rear-naked choke)
| PFL 2
| 
| align=center| 1
| align=center| 3:38
| Atlantic City, New Jersey, United States
|
|-
|Loss
|align=center|21–6–1
|Douglas Lima 
|Decision (unanimous)
|Bellator 232
|
|align=center|5
|align=center|5:00
|Uncasville, Connecticut, United States
|
|-
|Win
|align=center|21–5–1
|Neiman Gracie 
|Decision (unanimous)
|Bellator 222
|
|align=center|5
|align=center|5:00
|New York City, New York, United States
|
|-
|Draw
|align=center|
|Jon Fitch
|Draw (majority)
|Bellator 220
|
|align=center|5
|align=center|5:00
|San Jose, California, United States 
|
|-
|Loss
|align=center|20–5
|Gegard Mousasi
|TKO (punches and elbows)
|Bellator 206
|
|align=center|2
|align=center|3:23
|San Jose, California, United States
|
|-
|Win
|align=center|20–4
|Douglas Lima
|Decision (unanimous)
|Bellator 192
|
|align=center|5
|align=center|5:00
|Inglewood, California, United States
|
|-
|Win
|align=center|19–4
|Paul Daley
|Submission (rear-naked choke)
|Bellator 179
|
|align=center|2
|align=center|1:45
|London, England
|
|-
|Loss
|align=center|18–4
|Stephen Thompson
|Decision (unanimous)
|UFC Fight Night: MacDonald vs. Thompson
|
|align=center|5
|align=center|5:00
|Ottawa, Ontario, Canada
|
|-
|Loss
|align=center|18–3
|Robbie Lawler
|TKO (punches)
|UFC 189
|
|align=center|5
|align=center|1:00
|Las Vegas, Nevada, United States
|
|-
|Win
|align=center|18–2
|Tarec Saffiedine
|TKO (punches)
|UFC Fight Night: MacDonald vs. Saffiedine
|
|align=center|3
|align=center|1:28
| Halifax, Nova Scotia, Canada
| 
|-
|Win
|align=center|17–2
|Tyron Woodley
|Decision (unanimous)
|UFC 174
|
|align=center|3
|align=center|5:00
|Vancouver, British Columbia, Canada
|
|-
|Win
|align=center|16–2
|Demian Maia
|Decision (unanimous)
|UFC 170
|
|align=center|3
|align=center|5:00
|Las Vegas, Nevada, United States
|
|-
|Loss
|align=center|15–2
| Robbie Lawler
|Decision (split)
|UFC 167
|
|align=center|3
|align=center|5:00
|Las Vegas, Nevada, United States
|
|-
|Win
|align=center|15–1
| Jake Ellenberger
|Decision (unanimous)
|UFC on Fox: Johnson vs. Moraga
|
|align=center|3
|align=center|5:00
|Seattle, Washington, United States
|
|-
|Win
|align=center|14–1
| B.J. Penn
|Decision (unanimous)
|UFC on Fox: Henderson vs. Diaz
|
|align=center|3
|align=center|5:00
|Seattle, Washington, United States
|
|-
|Win
|align=center|13–1
| Che Mills
|TKO (punches)
|UFC 145
|
|align=center|2
|align=center|2:20
|Atlanta, Georgia, United States
|
|-
|Win
|align=center|12–1
| Mike Pyle
|TKO (punches)
|UFC 133
|
|align=center|1 
|align=center|3:54
|Philadelphia, Pennsylvania, United States
| 
|-
|Win
|align=center|11–1
|Nate Diaz
|Decision (unanimous)
|UFC 129
|
|align=center|3
|align=center|5:00
|Toronto, Ontario, Canada
|
|-
|Loss
|align=center|10–1
| Carlos Condit
|TKO (punches)
|UFC 115
|
|align=center|3
|align=center|4:53
|Vancouver, British Columbia, Canada
|
|-
|Win
|align=center|10–0
| Mike Guymon
|Submission (armbar)
|UFC Fight Night: Maynard vs. Diaz
|
|align=center|1
|align=center|4:27
|Fairfax, Virginia, United States
|
|-
|Win
|align=center|9–0
| Nick Hinchliffe
|KO (punches)
|KOTC Canada: Disturbed
|
|align=center|2
|align=center|2:08
|Edmonton, Alberta, Canada
|
|-
|Win
|align=center|8–0
| Elmer Waterhen
|Submission (armbar)
|KOTC Canada: Island Pride
|
|align=center|1
|align=center|1:27
|Nanaimo, British Columbia, Canada
|
|-
|Win
|align=center|7–0
| Clay French
|KO (punches)
|KOTC Canada: Grinder
|
|align=center|2
|align=center|4:26
|Calgary, Alberta, Canada
| 
|-
|Win
|align=center|6–0
| Kajan Johnson
|TKO (elbows and punches)
|KOTC Canada: Avalanche
|
|align=center|3
|align=center|1:48
|Moncton, New Brunswick, Canada
|
|-
|Win
|align=center|5–0
| Yoon Heo
|TKO (knees)
|KOTC Canada: Icebreaker
|
|align=center|2
|align=center|0:19
|Prince George, British Columbia, Canada
|
|-
|Win
|align=center|4–0
| Quinton Moreno
|Submission (triangle choke)
|KOTC Canada: Insurrection
|
|align=center|1
|align=center|N/A
|Vernon, British Columbia, Canada
|
|-
|Win
|align=center|3–0
| Jordan Mein
|Submission (rear-naked choke)
|Rumble in the Cage 17
|
|align=center|1
|align=center|4:04
|Lethbridge, Alberta, Canada
|
|-
|Win
|align=center|2–0
| Ken Tran
|Submission (rear-naked choke)
|KOTC Canada: Anarchy
|
|align=center|1
|align=center|2:33
|Prince George, British Columbia, Canada
|
|-
|Win
|align=center|1–0
| Terry Thiara
|Submission (rear-naked choke)
|Extreme Fighting Challenge 4
|
|align=center|1
|align=center|2:11
|Prince George, British Columbia, Canada
|

See also
 List of current PFL fighters
 List of male mixed martial artists
 List of Canadian UFC fighters

References

External links
 Rory MacDonald at PFL
 
 

1989 births
Living people
Canadian male mixed martial artists
Welterweight mixed martial artists
Mixed martial artists utilizing Brazilian jiu-jitsu
Canadian practitioners of Brazilian jiu-jitsu
People awarded a black belt in Brazilian jiu-jitsu
Sportspeople from British Columbia
Canadian people of Scottish descent
Canadian people of Irish descent
Former Roman Catholics
Canadian Christians
Bellator MMA champions
Ultimate Fighting Championship male fighters